Bridgton Academy is an all-male college preparatory in Bridgton, Maine. Founded in 1808, the school sits at the northern tip of Long Lake in North Bridgton, Maine. The school has been NEASC accredited since 1934, making it one of the oldest accredited schools in the country. The school is also a member of the National Association of Independent Schools.

The  campus hosts twenty four different buildings. The majority of classes are held in the new Humanities Center. There are seven dormitories on campus ranging in capacity from 18-40 students. In recent history, the school has expanded its number of two-year students, allowing for students to complete their high school diploma at Bridgton, as well as spending their second, prep, year at the Academy.

History

Originally chartered when Maine was part of Massachusetts, Bridgton Academy submitted the articles of its incorporation by taking a horse and buggy all the way to Boston in 1806, and welcomed its first class in 1808. What was originally a 4-year, co-ed institution morphed into a boys-only school, and then finally a one-year preparatory school in the 1960s.

From "A Brief History of Bridgton Academy" by Ernest N. Stevens (Class of 1899): "Bridgton was incorporated in 1794. It was still a small settlement. In 1800 it had only 646 inhabitants....The settlers in this whole region were chiefly from Massachusetts towns to the north of Boston, such as Andover, Boxford, Rowley and Newbury. They were largely of Puritan stock, of fair education themselves, and genuinely concerned about the education of their children. Within forty years from the original survey of the town and within twelve years of its incorporation they were talking of opening a secondary school. But the way was not easy. Massachusetts, within whose jurisdiction they then lived, would authorize no fly-by-night academies."

In 1806, three Bridgton citizens - Samuel Adams, Dr. Samuel Farnsworth and Enoch Perley - set about to raise the funds necessary to incorporate an Academy. The only question after their successful fundraising was where the school was to be located. At a stormy session held by the townsfolk and presided over by three trustees from neighboring academies, it was determined that the school would be located in North Bridgton because "...the natural beauty of the scenery was so great that it seemed that nature itself had designed that there should be a school in North Bridgton."

Beginning in 2013 the Bridgton Academy campus has undergone an extensive refurbishing, with major gardening and planting projects appearing throughout the campus, as well as new stonework, wrought iron gates, and paint and siding upgrades to every campus building. In 2018 major renovations were performed on Cleaves Hall, the school's largest residence hall. The entire interior was gutted, the floor plan was redesigned, and the building was completely updated. It was re-opened for the Class of 2019.

Alumni
 Clarence Black – media personality
 Steven Brooks – Syracuse Lacrosse two-time national championship player. Two time All American. Division I midfielder of the year. Alumnus of the NLL. Two-time MLL Cup winner. Member of the US Men’s National Team.
 Victor Cruz – American football wide receiver
 Amir Garrett - professional baseball player for the Cincinnati Reds
 Courtney Greene – American football defensive back
 Andrew Haldane – military personnel
 Simon M. Hamlin – politician
 Dr. Edward H. Hill – surgeon, founder of Central Maine Medical Center
 Thomas Treadwell Stone – Unitarian pastor and abolitionist
 Robert Vaden – professional basketball player
 Jermaine Wiggins – NFL tight end. Super Bowl champion with the New England Patriots (Super Bowl XXXVI).  Graduate of the University of Georgia.
Paris Horne - Professional Basketball player, Overseas Elite, 4x winner of The Basketball Tournament

Campus

The campus is set up on a hillside at the northern tip of Long Lake, and contains two academic buildings, seven dormitories, a dining hall, ice rink, gymnasium and locker rooms, and a multi-field turf athletic complex. There are also several Administrative buildings (including the Academy Building, built in 1830 and still standing today), the Twitchell Memorial Chapel and the Wolverine Den (student center; actually the renovated North Bridgton Church). The residence halls are: Cleaves Hall, Massachusetts Hall, Jillson Hall, Walker Hall, Sylvester Hall, Holt Hall and Potter House. Each dormitory houses between 11 and 38 students and vary in age from Massachusetts Hall (built ca. 1850) and sister dormitories Walker and Jillson (completed in 1987). For the 2017-18 school year, Cleaves Hall has been taken offline for a full renovation.

The campus recently underwent a major renovation at the top of Chadbourne Hill, replacing the existing Ellis-Fisher multi-use athletic field and baseball field with a completely new synthetic turf surface in the summer of 2015. The baseball field was also relocated to better account for sunlight and prevailing winds. In 2016 the baseball complex was officially named "Koop Field" and received a new, state-of-the-art scoreboard in right field. The Ham practice field was also extended to a full 100 yards.

References

External links
Bridgton Academy official site
profile of Bridgton Academy

Boarding schools in Maine
Private high schools in Maine
Preparatory schools in Maine
Schools in Cumberland County, Maine
Bridgton, Maine
Buildings and structures in Bridgton, Maine